A kitchen utensil is a hand-held, typically small tool that is designed for food-related functions. Food preparation utensils are a specific type of kitchen utensil, designed for use in the preparation of food. Some utensils are both food preparation utensils and eating utensils; for instance some implements of cutlery – especially knives – can be used for both food preparation in a kitchen and as eating utensils when dining (though most types of knives used in kitchens are unsuitable for use on the dining table).

In the Western world, utensil invention accelerated in the 19th and 20th centuries. It was fuelled in part by the emergence of technologies such as the kitchen stove and refrigerator, but also by a desire to save time in the kitchen, in response to the demands of modern lifestyles.

List

See also

 Cookware and bakeware
 Home appliance
 Kitchen utensil
 List of cooking appliances
 List of cooking techniques
 List of eating utensils
 List of food preparation techniques
 List of Japanese cooking utensils
 List of serving utensils

References

Utensil